Lauriacum was an important legionary Roman town on the Danube Limes in Austria.

History

Roman Era
Where only a small Roman settlement was located at a ford over the Enns, the Legio II Italica built a legion camp around 200AD, after the abandonment of an older site in Albing, during the subsequent 400 years of its occupation as headquarters and next to Virunum (In the area of today's Zollfeld at Maria Saal) and Ovilava (Wels) as administrative center for the Roman province of Noricum. The legionary camp was subsequently also part of the fortifications of the limes and probably from the 3rd to the 5th century continuously occupied with Roman troops. In the north and south-west was an extensive civilian settlement, which was probably raised to the municipality in the early third century and rose to the bishop's seat of the northern Noricum in the 5th century, which was until now only historically demonstrable. Grave fields could also be found at numerous places inside and outside the settlement area.

In the late period, it became the base for a patrol boat fleet and the production site of a state shield factory. After the abandonment of the border in Noricum and Rhaetia as a result of the dissolution of the Western Roman Empire, Lauriacum once again played a historically important role in the evacuation of the Roman population by Severin of Norikum. The bulk of the ancient building fabric fell victim to the extraction of stone material in the Middle Ages and in modern times, various building activities, agricultural use and soil erosion. The best preserved ancient and early medieval testimonies are the remains of their predecessors accessible in the lower church of the today's Basilica of St. Laurence, Lorch.

Middle Ages
Although today part of the city of Enns, the district was in the Middle Ages its own settlement. The town  has emerged from the Roman town of Lauriacum, named for St Lawrence.

Roman Lauriacum (Lorch) was mentioned in the Vita Sancti Severini and the Lauriacensis scutaria (fabrica). Notitia Dignitatum.

Between 1960 and 1966 archaeological excavations were used to open walls of Roman predecessors (dated from 180 AD), also excavated was the first Christian church (4th–5th century) and other church buildings from the first millennium. The town's present church is Gothic and was built around 1300.

Archaeology
After completion of the excavation work in 1966 St. Laurenz quickly received new attention:
1968: new survey of the town parish church
1968: survey of the first titular archbishopric of Central Europe; First titular archbishop of Lauriacum was Girolamo Prigione, former nuncio in Guatemala, El Salvador and Mexico.
1970: Ascent to the Basilica minor by Pope Paul VI.
1988: Visit by Pope John Paul II, who, with thousands of devotees, celebrated a worship of God at the Lorcher Basilica.

Diocese of Lauriacum
Lauriacum is a titular see of the Roman Catholic Church, and the cathedra was centered in the district of Lorch in the city of Enns.

The ancient diocese may have been a somewhat structured missionary mission founded by Aquileia and moved to the Limes with the relocation of the capital of Noricum from Teurnia (in Carinthia, Diocese of Tiburnia) to Ovilava (Wels). In the turmoil of the immigration of the peoples, it was abandoned after the withdrawal of the Romans in 488, and was not replaced by the Baier and Iro-Scottish missions at the dioceses of Salzburg and Diocese of Passau).

Known bishops
 Maximilian of Celeia (fl about 284), the first bishop according to legend
 Constantius of Lauriacum (5th century), head of the municipality of Enns, mentioned in Vita Severini.
Girolamo Prigione Apostolic Nunctio, Apostolischer Pro-Nunctio, Apostolischer Delegat (1968–2016) 
Andrzej Józwowicz Apostolic Nunctio (2017–current)

Lorcher fakes
The so-called Lorcher counterfeits, also known as the Pilgrim Fakes were an attempt by Piligrim, of Passau, to claim the Diocese of Passau as the legitimate successor to the Diocese of Lauracum.

In the basilica of St. Laurent is an oversized painting (8x5 m) dating from 1728, which the corresponding bishops call and depict according to the Lorcher falsification.

See also
Enns (town)

References

Roman towns and cities in Austria
Buildings and structures in Upper Austria
History of Upper Austria